WHAZ (1330 kHz) is a commercial AM radio station licensed to Troy, New York, and serving New York's Capital District. The station is owned by locally based Capital Media and broadcasts a Christian talk and teaching radio format.  National religious leaders heard on WHAZ include Jim Daly, Charles Stanley, Joyce Meyer, Chuck Swindoll and David Jeremiah.

WHAZ transmits fulltime with a non-directional antenna, from a transmitter site on Van Schaick Island in Cohoes. By day, it operates with 1,000 watts, but to protect other stations on 1330 AM from interference, at night it greatly reduces power to 49 watts. WHAZ's programming is also simulcast on four FM stations on the fringes of the market.

History

WHAZ is one of the oldest radio stations in the United States, and the Capital District's second-oldest station, after WGY.

On December 1, 1921, the U.S. Department of Commerce, which regulated radio at this time, adopted a regulation formally establishing a broadcasting station category, which set aside the wavelength of 360 meters (833 kHz) for entertainment broadcasts, and 485 meters (619 kHz) for market and weather reports. WHAZ's first license, for both broadcasting wavelengths, was issued on July 18, 1922, to the Rensselaer Polytechnic Institute (RPI) in Troy, New York. The call letters were randomly assigned from an alphabetic list of available call signs. 
Unlike many pioneer college radio stations, the Institute only had limited previous experience with radio technology. Funds for construction of the station at the Electrical Engineering Laboratory were primarily provided by three members, all RPI alumni, of the Roebling family: Washington A., John A., and the late Charles G.

The station made its first formal broadcast on September 11, 1922. Later that month the Department of Commerce set aside a second entertainment wavelength, 400 meters (750 kHz) for "Class B" stations that had quality equipment and programming. WHAZ was assigned to this new wavelength on a timesharing basis with General Electric's WGY in nearby Schenectady. In May 1923 additional "Class B" frequencies were made available, with the Schenectady/Troy region allocated 790 kHz, and WHAZ and WGY were reassigned to this new shared frequency.

On May 3, 1927, WHAZ was assigned by itself to 750 kHz, before being reassigned later that year to 980 kHz. On November 11, 1928, as part of a nationwide implementation of the provisions of the Federal Radio Commission's General Order 40, WHAZ was assigned to 1300 kHz in an historic four-way timeshare with three stations in New York City-area: The Jewish Daily Forward's WEVD, the Watchtower Bible and Tract Society's WBBR and the Defenders of the Truth Association's WHAP. WHAP later changed its call sign to WFAB, and in 1938 was sold and its hours transferred to WEVD. WHAZ continued to share time with WEVD and WBBR, and in March 1941, implementation of the North American Regional Broadcasting Agreement resulted in the three stations moving to 1330 kHz. At this time WHAZ operated daytime only, except for Monday night programming.

With the launch of an FM station, WRPI on November 1, 1957, and with most WHAZ programming transferred to the school's carrier current station, WRPI AM 640, WHAZ became expendable, only being operated with a minimal schedule and programming classical music. In 1963 it was determined that the station was far enough from New York City to allow it to operate with unrestricted hours during the daytime, although timesharing was still needed at night. In 1965 RPI attempted to sell WHAZ in two parts, with the station's daytime hours going to the Troy Record Company for $15,000, and its nighttime allocation, which was Monday nights from 6 p.m. to midnight, being transferred to WEVD for $50,000. However, WPOW, successor to WBBR, successfully blocked the sale, on the grounds that it needed to approve any changes in the timesharing agreement.

WHAZ was ultimately instead sold in 1967 to WPOW, Inc., for $65,000, with WHAZ becoming a daytime-only station, and WPOW receiving its Monday nighttime slot. Under its new owner WHAZ was programmed with a Christian religious format, which holds to this day. In 1973, WHAZ nearly added an FM variant of its programming on 107.7 MHz, however the death of that station's owner led to those plans being scrapped by his children, in favor of country music, with the station becoming WGNA. The station was later sold to the predecessor of current owner Capital Media.

The Camps spent several years trying to increase WHAZ's power, and gradually won approval to remain on the air 24 hours a day. However, its daytime signal only provides Grade B coverage to most of Schenectady, the market's second largest city. Its nighttime signal operates at only 49 watts, effectively limiting coverage to Rensselaer County; even there, it is barely listenable. However, all of their requests were turned down, since the FCC was unwilling to risk causing interference with the New York stations (WEVD's successor, WNYM, had by 1983 purchased and deleted WPOW's license, allowing WNYM to operate on a full-time basis).

Beginning in the 1990s, WHAZ expanded to FM through the acquisitions of four stations, including WMYY 97.3 (licensed to Schoharie, New York, and serving the Capital Region and Mohawk Valley), WBAR-FM 94.7 (licensed to Lake Luzerne, New York, and serving the Saratoga Springs and Glens Falls areas), and WMNV 104.1 (licensed to Rupert, Vermont, and rimshots Manchester and Rutland). In 2005, WZEC (licensed to Hoosick Falls, New York) was acquired and converted into a classic Christian Contemporary format for the Bennington, Vermont, area under the WHAZ-FM callsign, and later converted to an outright simulcast of WHAZ.

Simulcasts

See also
 WHAZ-FM

References

External links

FCC History Cards for WHAZ (covering 1927-1981)

HAZ
HAZ
Radio stations established in 1922
1922 establishments in New York (state)
Radio stations licensed before 1923 and still broadcasting